NaoKo TakaHashi (高橋 尚子, born 1973 in Niigata, Japan) is a London based artist.  Her works include performances and installations that highlight the ambiguities and confusions of national and individual identities played out through language, focusing on issues of dislocation, re-location and representation in a multi-cultural, multi-lingual society.

Solo exhibitions include Stubbornly Persistent Illusion Chapter 1: Red Planet  and An Exploration of Perforated Space in Four Segments of Words both at IMT Gallery, London, in 2013 and 2010 respectively, and A Tale of Two States at the Al Ma’mal Foundation for Contemporary Art, Jerusalem and the Al-Kahf Gallery, International Centre of Bethlehem, Palestine between 2008 and 2009.

Major group exhibitions include the 2012 triennial of contemporary art at the Palais de Tokyo, the Thessaloniki Biennale of Contemporary Art  and the 2009 Marrakech Biennale.

Her film, Good Morning At Night (2005), has been shown at Nikolaj Copenhagen Contemporary Art Centre and 24th Uppsala International Short Film Festival. In 2001, whilst studying at the Slade School of Fine Art, she was shortlisted for the Beck's Futures Student Film & Video Awards.  In 2007 Book Works published her experimental text Not So Too Much of Much of Everything.  She is also currently working on a musical project with Terry Kirkbride called the Marbles Jackson.

References

External links
 NaoKo TakaHashi's website
 Blog about the Marbles Jackson

Japanese women artists
Japanese contemporary artists
1973 births
Living people
People from Niigata Prefecture
Japanese expatriates in the United Kingdom
Alumni of the Slade School of Fine Art